WAKJ is a Christian radio station licensed to DeFuniak Springs, Florida, broadcasting on 91.3 MHz FM. The station is owned by First Baptist Church, Inc.

References

External links
WAKJ's official website

AKJ
Radio stations established in 1997
1997 establishments in Florida